Usul al-Ifta wa Adabuhu is a comprehensive guide to the principles and etiquette of issuing fatwas in Islamic law, authored by Taqi Usmani, a Pakistani scholar and former judge of the Federal Shariat Court and the Supreme Court of Pakistan. The book is considered one of the primary textbooks for advanced Fiqh students and is widely used in Islamic seminaries. It covers various aspects of fatwa, including its definition, types, and conditions for issuance, as well as providing guidelines for those seeking fatwas and the role of the mufti in the process. Drawing on a variety of sources, including the Quran and the teachings of Islamic scholars and the Prophet's companions, the book provides a thorough overview of the subject matter, including the history and development of Islamic jurisprudence and the importance of adopting a particular school of thought.

Background 
The book is based on Ibn Abidin's Sharh Ukud al-Mufti and has been enriched by various sources, including important considerations such as the history, requirements, and etiquettes of giving fatwas. While delivering lectures at the Department of Fatwa, Taqi Usmani wrote a memorandum to the students at Darul Uloom Karachi in which he summarized the book Sharh Ukud al-Mufti and added knowledge points, history of Fatwa, terms, and etiquette to aid in understanding the reality of Fatwa. Many students have been copying this memorandum to assist them in their studies, and numerous students have approached him to print it. However, in order to save the expense of copying and photocopying, he deferred printing the memorandum until he could re-examine it and form a new, independent compilation.

Despite his good intentions, several years passed as Taqi Usmani became over-engaged and constantly traveled. Eventually, he made it his priority to immerse himself in learning new things, correcting and refining complex subjects, and conducting extensive research. He omitted some points from the memorandum and added discussions that had a deep connection to the subject matter. With great effort, he refined the issues that required refinement and presented the results of his research in the book. This book takes the form of a complete compilation, serving its purpose and meeting the needs of the students.

Content 
The book is divided into nine chapters that cover a wide range of topics related to fatwa. In the first chapter, the author defines the concept of fatwa and its different types, such as shar'i, fiqhi, and juz'i fatwa. He also discusses the authority and responsibility of a mufti in issuing a fatwa, and the role of fatwa in Islamic law. The second chapter discusses the importance of adab (etiquette) in issuing and seeking a fatwa. The author highlights the need for a mufti to possess certain characteristics such as knowledge, piety, and sincerity, and the mustafti to approach the mufti with humility and respect. The third chapter explores the historical development of Islamic jurisprudence (fiqh) and the different schools of thought that emerged over time. The author discusses the reasons behind the emergence of different schools and their methods of interpreting the Quran and Sunnah. In the fourth chapter, the author discusses the conditions that a person must fulfill to be qualified as a mufti. He emphasizes the importance of possessing knowledge, piety, and experience, and the need to follow a particular school of thought. The fifth chapter discusses the role of taqlid (following a particular school of thought) in Islamic law and the different degrees of taqlid. The author emphasizes the importance of following a reliable scholar or mufti and the need to avoid blind following. The sixth chapter provides an overview of the classification of jurists according to their level of knowledge and expertise. The author explains the concept of "layers of scholars" in the Hanafi and Shafi'i schools of thought and discusses some of the criticisms leveled against this classification system. In the seventh chapter, the author discusses the issue of issuing a fatwa based on another school of thought. He explains the conditions that must be met for a mufti to issue a fatwa based on another school of thought and the limits of such fatwas. The eighth chapter discusses the principles of the Mecelle, which is a comprehensive legal code in Islamic law. The author explains the background and development of the Mecelle and its importance in Islamic law. In the final chapter, the author provides a summary of the main points covered in the book and emphasizes the importance of following the principles and etiquettes of issuing and seeking fatwas in Islamic law.

Translation 
The book was translated into Bengali by Harunur Rashid and edited by Mahmudul Hasan Jamshed, and it was published by Maktabatun Nusrah. Additionally, it has been translated into Turkish by Emre Yazici and published by Yasin Publishing House.

See also 
 Deobandi fiqh

References

External links 
 Usul al-Ifta wa Adabuhu at Internet Archive

Deobandi fiqh literature
Books by Muhammad Taqi Usmani
Islamic literature
Sunni literature
Hanafi literature
Arabic-language books
Books about Islamic jurisprudence
Sharia
Legal codes
Pakistani non-fiction books
2011 non-fiction books
2011 books